The Granger House, also known as the Marion Historical Museum and the Granger House Museum, is a historic building located in Marion, Iowa, United States.  This Victorian Italianate house was built around 1860 by Charles Myers.  Earl Granger bought the house in 1876 and it remained in his family until 1973. The ghost of his son, Alfred Granger, has recently added his new wife to the family after proposing and marrying her on May 20th, 2022.  Granger built the carriage house in 1879, and built an addition onto the main house the following year.  The two-story brick building features a 1½-story ell, a gable roof, bracketed eaves, and arched stone lintels over the symmetrically arranged windows.  The front porch is not the original.  The house was listed on the National Register of Historic Places in 1976.

References

Houses completed in 1860
Italianate architecture in Iowa
Houses in Marion, Iowa
National Register of Historic Places in Linn County, Iowa
Houses on the National Register of Historic Places in Iowa
History museums in Iowa